Arilena Ara (born 17 July 1998) is an Albanian singer and television presenter. Ara rose to national recognition in Albania, upon her victory at X Factor Albania in 2013. After her participation in the 18th edition of the music contest , her song "" found significant success in Romania and Eastern Europe, peaking at number-one in the Romanian Airplay chart. Following her forthcoming success at the 58th edition of the music contest  in 2019, she was designated as the Albanian representative at the Eurovision Song Contest 2020, before the contest's cancellation.

Life and career

1998–2018: Early life and career beginnings 

Arilena Ara was born on 17 July 1998 into an Albanian family in the city of Shkodër, Albania. Ara performed in various dancing and singing competitions as a child, including at the children's talent show  finishing in third place. She won the second series of the talent show X Factor Albania on 31 March 2013. Her first single, "", was released in February 2014. Finishing in third place, Ara participated in the 18th edition of the music contest  with the song "" in November 2016. The song subsequently experienced commercial success abroad, peaking at number one on the Romanian Radio and TV Airplay rankings as well as reaching number 3 in Bulgaria and number 38 in Hungary. In early 2017, the song's remixes, including " (Bess Remix)" and " (Beverly Pills Remix)", further reached the top 20 in the Commonwealth of Independent States (CIS). In the course of 2017, Ara performed at the Europa Plus Festival in Moscow, Russia, and won the award for the song of the year at the Astana Dausy Music Awards in Astana, Kazakhstan.

2019–present: Pop Art and continued success 

As of 2019, Ara has been a juror for the third series of the singing show The Voice Kids Albania. After winning the 58th edition of the music contest  with the song "" in late December 2019,  (RTSH) designated Ara as the Albanian representative for the Eurovision Song Contest 2020 in Rotterdam, the Netherlands. In February 2020, following several months spent in Los Angeles, the singer announced that she had started working on her debut studio album. In March 2020, due to the COVID-19 pandemic, the European Broadcasting Union (EBU) cancelled the Eurovision Song Contest 2020. After a short hiatus, she was featured on Albanian singer Alban Skënderaj's "A i sheh" in December 2020, which peaked at number 29 in Albania.

Ara released her debut studio album, Pop Art The Album, on 6 November 2021. Prior to its release, four singles, "Murderer", "Aligator", "Thirr Policinë" and "Ke me mungu", were released from the record. Containing R&B and hip hop music, "Murderer" featuring Albanian rapper Noizy was released as the record's lead single in July 2021. Its second single, "Aligator", followed on 9 August 2021 and peaked at number five in Albania. For the record's third single titled, "Thirr Policinë", the singer collaborated with Kosovo-Albanian musician Dafina Zeqiri and reached number six in Albania. Ara scored her first number-one single with "Ke me mungu" in October 2021. In April 2022, she debuted as a television presenter, hosting the investigative show .

Artistry 

Ara names Michael Jackson as her major musical and artistic influence.

Discography

Albums 
 Pop Art (2021)

Singles

As lead artist

As featured artist

Other charted songs

See also 
 List of awards and nominations received by Arilena Ara

Notes

References

External links 

1998 births
21st-century Albanian women singers
Albanian songwriters
Albanian-language singers
Albanian television presenters
Eurovision Song Contest entrants for Albania
Eurovision Song Contest entrants of 2020
Festivali i Këngës winners
Living people
Musicians from Shkodër
The X Factor winners